Laura Ingalls Wilder's Little House on the Prairie is a 2005 American western television miniseries directed by David L. Cunningham. It is a six-part adaptation of children's novels Little House in the Big Woods (1932) and Little House on the Prairie (1935) by Laura Ingalls Wilder. It was broadcast on ABC as part of The Wonderful World of Disney anthology series.

Cast
 Cameron Bancroft as Charles Ingalls
 Erin Cottrell as Caroline Ingalls
 Kyle Chavarria as Laura Ingalls
 Danielle Chuchran as Mary Ingalls
 Gregory Sporleder as Mr. Edwards
 Nathaniel Arcand as Kiowa Brave
 Allen Belcourt as Young Kiowa Warrior
 Byron Chief-Moon as Soldat Du Chene
 Melanie Corcoran as Independence prostitute
 James Cosmo as Mr. Scott
 Geoffrey Ewert as Townsman
 Richard Halliday as Shopkeeper
 Dorian Harewood as Dr. Tan
 Jimmy Herman as Osage
 Daniel Jeffery as Boy
 Tim Koetting as Major Callaghan
 Barbara Kozicki as Aunt Docie
 Griffin Powell-Arcand as Young Indian Boy
 Sammy Simon as Medicine-man
 Royal Sproule as Post employee
 Gina Stockdale as Mrs. Scott

Episodes

Release

Home media
The miniseries was released on DVD on March 28, 2006.

Reception
An uncredited review in the Province stated that "This type of family drama is as quaint and rare now as a log cabin, but children will enjoy the miniseries a lot and parents will like watching it with them." Allesandra Stanley of the New York Times thought that the miniseries was more faithful to Wilder's books than was the 1970s and 1980s TV series.

References

External links
 
 
 

Little House series
2000s American television miniseries
American films based on actual events
Television shows set in Minnesota
Television shows based on American novels
Period family drama television series
American Broadcasting Company original programming
Television series by ABC Studios
2005 American television series debuts
2005 American television series endings